Aclidinium bromide/formoterol, sold under the brand names Duaklir and Brimica, is a fixed-dose combination medication for inhalation, used in the management of chronic obstructive pulmonary disease (COPD). It consists of aclidinium bromide, a long-acting muscarinic antagonist, and formoterol, a long-acting β2 agonist.

References

External links 
 
 

Beta-adrenergic agonists
Bronchodilators
Combination drugs
AstraZeneca brands
Muscarinic antagonists